Dick Conroy (29 July 1927 – 1991) was an English professional footballer who played in the Football League for both of his hometown clubs – Bradford City and Bradford Park Avenue. He also played for Swain House and Grantham Town.

References

1927 births
1991 deaths
Footballers from Bradford
Association football defenders
English footballers
Bradford City A.F.C. players
Bradford (Park Avenue) A.F.C. players
Grantham Town F.C. players
English Football League players